Edward Kerwick (17 June 1922 – 19 July 2010) was an English professional rugby league footballer who played in the 1930s, 1940s and 1950s. He served with the Royal Artillery during World War II.

Background
Ted Kerwick was born in St. Helens, Lancashire, his birth was registered in Prescot, Lancashire, England, and he died aged 88 in Windle, St. Helens, Merseyside.

Playing career

International honours
Ted Kerwick won a cap for England while at Leigh in 1949 against Other Nationalities.

County Cup Final appearances
Ted Kerwick played left-, in Leigh's 7–20 defeat by Wigan in the 1949 Lancashire County Cup Final during the 1949–50 season at Wilderspool Stadium, Warrington on Saturday 29 October 1949, played  in the 6–14 defeat by Wigan in the 1951 Lancashire County Cup Final during the 1951–52 season at Station Road, Swinton on Saturday 27 October 1951, and played left-, in the 22–5 victory over St. Helens in the 1952 Lancashire County Cup Final during the 1952–53 season at Station Road, Swinton on Saturday 29 November 1952.

References

External links
Statistics at wigan.rlfans.com
(archived by web.archive.org) Statistics at orl-heritagetrust.org.uk
Statistics at rugby.widnes.tv

1922 births
2010 deaths
British Army personnel of World War II
England national rugby league team players
English rugby league players
Lancashire rugby league team players
Leigh Leopards captains
Leigh Leopards players
Oldham R.L.F.C. players
Royal Artillery soldiers
Rugby league centres
Rugby league five-eighths
Rugby league players from St Helens, Merseyside
St Helens Recreation RLFC players
St Helens R.F.C. players
Widnes Vikings players
Wigan Warriors wartime guest players
Workington Town players